Yerky is an urban-type settlement located in Zvenyhorodka Raion (district) of Cherkasy Oblast (province) in central Ukraine. It hosts the administration of Yerky settlement hromada, one of the hromadas of Ukraine. Population: 

Until 18 July 2020, Yerky belonged to Katerynopil Raion. The raion was abolished in July 2020 as part of the administrative reform of Ukraine, which reduced the number of raions of Cherkasy Oblast to four. The area of Katerynopil Raion was merged into Zvenyhorodka Raion.

People from Yerky
 Viacheslav Chornovil (1937), Ukrainian politician, dissident, and longtime proponent of Ukrainian independence.

References

External links 
 

Urban-type settlements in Zvenyhorodka Raion
Populated places established in 1960